Legislative elections were held in Taiwan on 2 December 1989 to elect members of the Legislative Yuan.

Background
Compared with the sixth supplementary election the number of new delegates to the Legislative Yuan had been increased from 100 to 130. Of these, 101 were to be elected directly representing Taiwan Province and the special municipalities of Taipei City and Kaohsiung City. The remaining 29 seats were to represent overseas nationals, these delegates were appointed by the President.

Results
Turnout for the supplementary election was 75.5%. Of the 101 directly elected delegates, 72 belonged to the Kuomintang, 21 to Democratic Progressive Party and 8 were independents.

By virtue of achieving more than 20 seats, the Democratic Progressive Party secured the prerogative to propose legislation in the Legislative Yuan.

References

See also  
History of Taiwan (1945–present)#Democratic reforms
Politics of the Republic of China
List of political parties in Taiwan
Political status of Taiwan

Taiwan
Legislative elections in Taiwan
1989 elections in Taiwan
Election and referendum articles with incomplete results